The  is a former railway line and current bus line in western Japan operated by the West Japan Railway Company (JR West). Whilst the first section opened in 1930, the line was not completed until 1975. Owing to declining patronage, the entire rail line ceased operation on 31 March 2018, to be replaced by a bus service on 1 April 2018.

Stations

Rolling stock

Services on the line were operated by JR West single-car KiHa 120 diesel multiple units.

History
The Gotsu to Kawado section opened in 1930, and the line was extended progressively east, reaching Hamahara in 1937. The Miyoshi to Shikijiki section opened in 1955 as a passenger-only line, and was extended to Kuchiba in 1963, and Hamahara in 1975, completing the line.

Closure
On 16 October 2015, JR West announced that it was considering closing the line owing to poor patronage, and was in discussion with the two prefectures served by the line, Shimane and Hiroshima, as well as other municipalities served, concerning future plans. In fiscal 2014, the line carried an average of 50 passengers per km per day, compared to 458 per km per day in 1987. On 29 September 2016, JR West announced that the entire line would close on 31 March 2018. The line then closed on March 31, 2018, with an event hosted by JR West.

See also
 List of railway lines in Japan

References

 
1067 mm gauge railways in Japan
1930 establishments in Japan
Lines of West Japan Railway Company
Rail transport in Hiroshima Prefecture
Rail transport in Shimane Prefecture
Railway lines opened in 1930